Mathieu Bock-Côté (born August 20, 1980), often referred to by his initials MBC, is a Canadian sociologist, essayist, writer, public intellectual and conservative political commentator who currently resides in Paris, where he appears as a television and radio personality.

An alumnus of the Université de Montréal (UdeM) and Université du Québec à Montréal (UQAM), from which he received his PhD, he worked at the Université de Sherbrooke (UdeS) as a chargé de cours, a position he currently holds at UdeM's HEC Montréal. Bock-Côté, a noted columnist at Le Journal de Montréal, is known for his work on and criticism of multiculturalism and immigration. He strongly supports the Quebec sovereignty movement.

Career
Best known for his advocacy of Quebec nationalism and free speech, he is a prominent critic of multiculturalism, anationalism and political correctness. Bock-Côté worked as a columnist for 24 Hours before being hired by Le Journal de Montréal. His open letters are published in newspapers such as La Presse and Le Devoir. When he resided in Montreal, he was a frequent guest on television shows on Télé-Québec and Le Canal Nouvelles. In France, his columns are published by Le Figaro.

He has been characterized as a sovereignist, a conservative, as well as put on the far-right, despite the fact that the latter characterization has widely been disputed, particularly in French-speaking media. In 2019, Premier of Quebec François Legault said to be a reader of his book The Empire of Political Correctness, although Bock-Côté has notable critics in Quebec as well.

In 2021, Bock-Côté moved to Paris as he was recruited by CNews to participate in a Saturday weekly political show hosted by Thomas Lequertier, in which he debates about public affairs with a guest. In parallel, he has appeared as a guest on some of the channel's other programs. Bock-Côté also has a ten-minute morning radio column on Europe 1 four times a week, titled "La Carte blanche de Mathieu Bock-Côté". He has become an attentive follower of French politics, stating: "France is a fascinating intellectual and political laboratory".

He is married to journalist, animator and producer Karima Brikh. He met her on the show she was hosting.

Works
The Identity City (2007)
The Quiet Denationalization (2007)
End of cycle (2012)
Political exercises (2013)
Multiculturalism as a political religion (2016)
The New Regime (2017)
The Empire of Political Correctness (2019)
The Racialist Revolution, and Other Ideological Viruses (2021)

References

External links
 Mathieu Bock-Côté blog at the Le Journal de Montréal

1980 births
Living people
Activists from Montreal
Canadian non-fiction writers
Canadian people of French descent
Canadian television personalities
Quebecor people
Canadian media personalities
CNews people
People by company in Canada
Canadian sociologists
Canadian columnists
Critics of multiculturalism
Canadian critics of Islam
Male critics of feminism
Free speech activists
Historians from Quebec
People from Laurentides
Television personalities from Montreal
Theorists on Western civilization
Université de Montréal alumni
Université du Québec à Montréal alumni
Writers from Montreal
Academic staff of HEC Montréal
Academic staff of the Université de Sherbrooke
Quebec sovereigntists
Conservatism in Canada
French Quebecers
Le Figaro people
Anti-English sentiment